Thyella (Greek: Α/Τ Θύελλα, "Storm") was a Thyella class destroyer that served in the Royal Hellenic Navy (1907-1941). It was the first ship of that name in the Hellenic Navy.

The ship, along with her three sister ships, was ordered from Britain in 1905 and was built in the Yarrow shipyard at Cubitt Town, London.

During World War I, Greece belatedly entered the war on the side of the Triple Entente and, due to Greece's neutrality the four Thyella class ships were seized by the Allies in October 1916, taken over by the French in November and served in the French Navy 1917–18. By 1918, they were back on escort duty under Greek colors, mainly in the Aegean Sea. Thyella saw action in the Greco-Turkish War (1919-1922).

In World War II, Thyella saw action and was sunk during the German invasion on April 21, 1941, off Vouliagmeni near Athens.

See also
History of the Hellenic Navy

References

Thyella-class destroyers
Ships built in Cubitt Town
1907 ships
World War I destroyers of Greece
World War II destroyers of Greece
World War II shipwrecks in the Aegean Sea
Maritime incidents in April 1941
Destroyers sunk by aircraft
Ships sunk by German aircraft
Shipwrecks of Greece